Ernie O'Rourke (born 8 April 1926) is a former Australian rules footballer who played with Melbourne and North Melbourne in the Victorian Football League (VFL).

Notes

External links 

1926 births
Living people
Australian rules footballers from Victoria (Australia)
Melbourne Football Club players
North Melbourne Football Club players